Montfortula brevirimata is a species of sea snail, a marine gastropod mollusk in the family Fissurellidae, the keyhole limpets and slit limpets.

Description
The length of the shell attains 5 mm.

Distribution
This marine species occurs off Réunion.

References

External links
 Deshayes, G. P. (1863). Catalogue des mollusques de l'île de la Réunion (Bourbon). Pp. 1-144. In Maillard, L. (Ed.) Notes sur l'Ile de la Réunion. Dentu, Paris.
 To World Register of Marine Species

Fissurellidae
Gastropods described in 1862